Tully Township is one of the twelve townships of Van Wert County, Ohio, United States.  The 2000 census found 2,119 people in the township, 1,009 of whom lived in the unincorporated portions of the township.

Geography
Located in the northwestern corner of the county along the Indiana line, it borders the following townships:
Benton Township, Paulding County - north
Blue Creek Township, Paulding County - northeast corner
Union Township - east
Pleasant Township - southeast corner
Harrison Township - south
Union Township, Adams County, Indiana - southwest
Monroe Township, Allen County, Indiana - west

The village of Convoy is located in southeastern Tully Township.

Name and history
Statewide, the only other Tully Township is located in Marion County.

Government
The township is governed by a three-member board of trustees, who are elected in November of odd-numbered years to a four-year term beginning on the following January 1. Two are elected in the year after the presidential election and one is elected in the year before it. There is also an elected township fiscal officer, who serves a four-year term beginning on April 1 of the year after the election, which is held in November of the year before the presidential election. Vacancies in the fiscal officership or on the board of trustees are filled by the remaining trustees.

References

External links
County website

Townships in Van Wert County, Ohio
Townships in Ohio